Miss Diva 2019 was the 7th edition of the Miss Diva beauty pageant held on 26 September 2019. Miss Universe India 2018, Nehal Chudasama crowned Vartika Singh as her successor. She represented India at Miss Universe 2019 which was held in Atlanta, Georgia. Shefali Sood was crowned as Miss Supranational India 2019 by her predecessor, Aditi Hundia and she represented India at Miss Supranational 2019 held in Poland. Also, Varun Verma was selected as India's representative at the Mister Supranational 2019 contest.

Background
In 2019, Liva Fluid Fashion obtained the sponsorship rights for the Miss Diva pageant from the previous sponsor, Yamaha Fascino. The first edition under their support was scheduled be held in 2020. Since there was no official pageant in 2019, Indian representatives for international pageants were appointed by the Miss India Organization. Preceding Miss Diva delegates were selected to compete in Miss Universe 2019 and Miss Supranational 2019 contests. The new titleholders - Vartika Singh, Shefali Sood and Varun Verma were sashed by Kangana Ranaut in a ceremony.

Final results
Color keys

Notes

 Vartika Singh was among the Top 7 finalists at Miss Diva 2014.
 Shefali Sood was among the Top 10 finalists at Miss Diva 2018.
 Varun Verma was the 1st runner-up at Mister India 2016.

References

Miss Diva
2019 beauty pageants
2019 in India
September 2019 events in India